Lenny Vandermade (born January 3, 1981) is an American football coach and former player. He currently serves as an Offensive Analyst at the University of Southern California.

High school career
Vandermade prepped at Mater Dei High School in Santa Ana, California. He was a 1998 Super Prep All-American, USA Today All-USA honorable mention, Prep Star Dream Team Top 100, Super Prep All-Farwest, Prep Star All-Western, Long Beach Press-Telegram Best in the West honorable mention, Orange County Register Fab 15 second-team, Tacoma News Tribune Western 100, Cal-Hi Sports All-State first-team, All-CIF Southern Section first-team, All-CIF Division I first-team, Los Angeles Times All-Orange County, Orange County Register All-Orange County first-team and All-South Coast League first-team as a senior at Mater Dei. He did not allow a sack in 1998 as a left offensive tackle. On defense, he had 26 tackles with 2 sacks. Mater Dei went 13-1, won the CIF Division I championship and was ranked No. 2 nationally by USA Today.

As a 1997 junior, he made the Cal-Hi Sports All-State Underclass first-team, All-CIF Southern Section second-team, All-CIF Division I first-team, Los Angeles Times All-Orange County first-team, Orange County Register All-Orange County second-team and All-South Coast League first-team.

He made the Cal-Hi Sports All-State Sophomore first-team and All-South Coast League second-team as a 1996 sophomore as Mater Dei went 14-0, won the CIF Division I title and was named national champion by USA Today. He earned at least a 90% blocking grade in all of his games as a junior and senior. He also posted 78 career tackles (7 were sacks). A 3-year starter, Mater Dei went 40-2 during that time. Fellow Trojans Matt Grootegoed, Matt Leinart and Will Collins also prepped at Mater Dei.

College career
Vandermade played college football at the University of Southern California.

2003: The steady, reliable Vandermade started at left offensive guard as a senior in 2003, his fourth season as a line starter. He was slowed during the early part of 2003 spring practice while recovering from a biceps injury. He won USC's Co-Lifter of the Year award.

2002: Vandermade started for his third season on the offensive line, this time at left guard as a junior in 2002 (he also has seen action at center in his career). He tore his right biceps tendon at Stanford, which required surgery and sidelined him the rest of the 2002 season.

2001: Vandermade started for his second season at center as just a sophomore in 2001. He started 8 games (all but Oregon, Washington, Arizona State and Notre Dame) and appeared in 11 contests (he did not play at Washington). He also saw some action at guard in 2001. He was on the "Watch List" for the 2001 Dave Rimington Trophy, given to the nation's top center.

2000: As just a redshirt freshman in 2000, Vandermade did an exceptional job while starting all season, the first 5 games at left offensive guard (for an injured Trevor Roberts) and then the final 7 contests at center (for an injured Eric Denmon). He was named to the 2000 Freshman All-American first-teams by The Sporting News and Football News.

Professional career
Vandermade played for the National Football League champion Pittsburgh Steelers NFL Europe affiliate Hamburg Sea Devils.  He was originally signed by the Baltimore Ravens.

Coaching career
In addition to USC, Vandermade has coached at San Diego State, the University of San Diego, and Santa Margarita Catholic High School.

External links

USD profile
USC profile

1981 births
Living people
Sportspeople from Santa Ana, California
Players of American football from California
American football offensive guards
USC Trojans football players
Pittsburgh Steelers players
Hamburg Sea Devils players
San Diego State Aztecs football coaches
San Diego Toreros football coaches
American people of Polynesian descent